This page lists the results of leadership elections held by the Union Nationale.  Before 1961 leaders were chosen by the caucus.

Leadership 1936-1961

The Union Nationale (UN) was formed at a caucus of Conservative Party of Quebec and Action libérale nationale MLAs on June 20, 1936. Conservative leader Maurice Duplessis was chosen leader of this new party.

Duplessis led the party until his death on September 7, 1959. On September 10 the caucus elected Paul Sauvé as leader and became premier the following day. Sauve in turn died on January 2, 1960. Antonio Barrette was elected by the caucus on January 7 as leader and became premier the next day.

Following the UN's defeat in the 1960 general election Barette resigned as UN leader on September 15, 1960. The caucus elected Yves Prévost as interim leader the following day. He resigned on January 11, 1961, and was succeeded as interim leader by Antonio Talbot.

1961 leadership convention

(Held September 23, 1961)

Daniel Johnson, Sr. 1,006
Jean-Jacques Bertrand 912
Armand Nadeau 24
Raymond Maher 2

Yves Gabias and Maurice S. Hebert withdrew before balloting.

Johnson died on September 26, 1968. Jean-Jacques Bertrand was chosen interim leader and premier on October 2.

1969 leadership convention

(Held June 21, 1969)

Jean-Jacques Bertrand 1,327
Jean-Guy Cardinal 938
André Léveillé 22

1971 leadership convention

(Held June 19, 1971)

First ballot:
Gabriel Loubier 529
Marcel Masse 482
Mario Beaulieu 178
Pierre Sévigny 26
André Léveillé 0

Second ballot (Sevigny and Leveille eliminated):
Gabriel Loubier 568
Marcel Masse 544
Mario Beaulieu 99

Third ballot (Beaulieu eliminated):
Gabriel Loubier 607
Marcel Masse 584

Loubier resigned on March 30, 1974. Maurice Bellemare was chosen interim leader by the executive.

1976 leadership convention

(Held May 22, 1976)

Rodrigue Biron 764
Jacques Tétreault 270
Gerard Nepveu 126
Jean-Guy Leboeuf 106
William Shaw 60

Biron resigned on March 3, 1980, and crossed the floor to join  the Parti Québécois a few months later. Michel Le Moignan was chosen interim leader.

1981 leadership convention

(Held January 9, 1981)

Roch La Salle acclaimed

1982 leadership convention

(Held October 24, 1982)

Jean-Marc Béliveau acclaimed

See also
leadership convention
Union Nationale (Quebec)

References

http://www.assnat.qc.ca/en/patrimoine/chronologie/index.html

Political party leadership elections in Quebec